Iván Navarro (born 1972 in Santiago, Chile) is a Chilean artist who works with light, mirrors, and glowing glass tubes to craft socially and politically relevant sculptures and installations. , he lives and works in Brooklyn, New York.

Early life and education  

Navarro was born and raised in Santiago, Chile. The politics and government of his homeland have had a profound impact on his work, both in his choice of media, and in the meaning and thought process he portrays in  his neon sculptures and faux-furniture. As he grew up during the dictatorship of General Augusto Pinochet, Navarro was used to electricity being shut off to keep citizens at home and isolated; “All the pieces that I’ve made make reference to controlling activity, and electricity was a way to control people.”

His father was a left-leaning dean of a university.

Navarro initially intended to study theatrical set design at Pontifical Catholic University of Chile, but was not accepted by that department, so he studied art instead. He continued to participate informally in design and lighting for theater, and was awarded a BFA degree in 1995.

Artwork

An example of Navarro's work being steeped in his homeland's history while also speaking to current political debates, is his You Sit, You Die, which consists of a lounge chair built from white fluorescent tubes. "'This is my version of the electric chair', the artist explains. Electricity was one of the tools of torture preferred by the Chilean government, but the piece also has local currency. On the paper seat, he has written the names of every individual executed in Florida by electric chair, to bear witness to the state's record on capital punishment."

Navarro also works with light and infinity mirrors, in which viewers lose themselves in an apparently infinite space, as neon phrases or structures loom out, and suggest what lies beyond. These abyss-like works can link back to Navarro's fear of being abducted as a child. As he navigates his past, the artist readily admits, "There is a certain amount of fear in my pieces". In ‘Criminal Ladder’ (2005), Navarro created a 30-feet-high ladder made with fluorescent light tubes. On the tubes he has written the names of people who committed human rights abuses during the Pinochet time in power.

He is represented by Galerie Daniel Templon.

Selected exhibitions and works 
2019 
MACBA, Buenos Aires, Argentina
This Land is Your Land, currently installed at Navy Pier, Chicago, Illinois (July 27, 2018 - September 30, 2019)
2018
Prostutopia, Galerie Templon, Brussels
Hangang Art Park Creation Project, Seoul, Korea 
Podium, Galerie Templon 
2017
Fanfare, Galerie Daniel Templon, Paris Rue Beauborg
Untitled, The Nelson Atkins Museum of Art, Kansas City, MO  USA
 2016
Summer Sculpture Exhibition, Paul Kasmin Gallery 
Mute Parade, Paul Kasmin Gallery
Vigilantes, Museo del Hongo, Museo de Arte Contemporáneo de Valdivia 
2014
Nacht und Nebel, Galerie Daniel Templon, Brussels
This Land is Your Land, originally installed at Madison Square Park, New York (February 20, 2014 - April 20, 2014) 
2013 
Where is the Next War?, Galerie Daniel Templon, Paris
2012 
Impenetrables, Art Kabinett, Paul Kasmin Gallery, Art Basel, Miami
Iván Navarro: Fluorescent Light Sculptures, Frost Museum of Art, Miami
Heaven or Las Vegas, SCAD Museum of Art, Savannah, Georgia, US
Nacht und Nebel, Fondazione Volume!, Rome
2011 
UNO Fence, Prospect.2 at UNO Gallery, New Orleans
The Armory Fence, Paul Kasmin Gallery at the Armory Show, New York
Heaven or Las Vegas, Paul Kasmin Gallery, New York 
2010
Tener Dolor en el Cuerpo de Otro, Distrito 4, Madrid
Tierra de Nadie, Caja De Burgos, Burgos, Spain
Missing, Chambre Blanche, Manif d´art 5, Catastrophe?, Quebec, Canada
2009 
Die, Paul Kasmin Gallery, New York
Nowhere Man, Galerie Daniel Templon, Paris
Threshold, 53rd Biennale di Venezia, Chilean Pavilion, Venice
Nowhere Man, Contemporary Art Center Towner, Eastbourne, UK 
 2008
Antifurniture, Galerie Daniel Templon, Paris
 2006 
Spy Glass, Galerie Daniel Templon, Paris
 2004
Juice sucker, CSPS Legion Arts, Iowa, USA
 Monuments for D. Flavin, Roebling Hall, Brooklyn, USA
 2002
Blade runner, Gasworks Studios, London, UK
 2001
Big Bang, Galería Animal, Santiago, Chile
 1996
 Camping day, PUC, Santiago, Chile

Selected collections
Hirshhorn Museum and Sculpture Garden, Washington DC
Virginia Museum of Fine Arts, Richmond, Virginia
Boston Museum of Fine Arts, Boston
Fonds National d’Art Contemporain, Paris
Towner Contemporary Art Museum, Eastbourne, UK
LVMH Collection, Paris 
Saatchi Collection, London 
Martin Z. Margulies Warehouse, Miami
Centro Galego de Arte Contemporanea, Santiago de Compostela, Spain
Solomon R. Guggenheim Museum, New York
Vanhaerents Art Collection, Brussels

Further reading

References

1972 births
Chilean artists
Living people
People from Santiago
Artists from Santiago
Chilean sculptors
Male sculptors
Chilean male artists